Bhalchandra Babaji Dikshit (7 September 1902 - 1977) was an Indian physician and pharmacologist.  He was the first director of AIIMS, New Delhi. He obtained an M.B.B.S. in 1925 from Bombay University and a D.P.H. from Calcutta University in 1925. He gained both an M.R.C.P.E. in 1933 and a Ph.D in 1934 from the University of Edinburgh.

He was awarded the Padma Bhushan, third highest civilian honour of India by the President of India, in 1965.

References

1902 births
1977 deaths
Marathi people
Recipients of the Padma Bhushan in medicine
20th-century Indian medical doctors
People from Amravati
Medical doctors from Maharashtra
Directors of the All India Institute of Medical Sciences, New Delhi
Indian pharmacologists